Daffy Dilly is a 1948 Warner Bros. Merrie Melodies cartoon directed by Chuck Jones. The cartoon was released on October 30, 1948, and stars Daffy Duck.

"Daffy Dilly" is notable for being an early example of a greedy, self-centered Daffy (with some "screwball" elements), as perfected by Jones.

The title is a word play on daffodil.

Plot
Daffy Duck is a struggling novelty gag salesman operating on the sidewalk of a large city, futilely hawking things like flower squirters, a Joe Miller joke book, a rib-tickler, a chicken inspector badge and a 200-volt electric hand buzzer, inadvertently demonstrating the latter on himself ("It's... shocking...").  But then he hears a news bulletin on a nearby radio that buzzsaw tycoon J.B. Cubish, who has not laughed in 50 years and is on his deathbed, is offering one million dollars to anyone who can make him laugh just one more time before he dies.

Seeing his chance at a huge payday, Daffy immediately sets off for the Cubish's mansion, but his butler refuses to let him inside. Daffy tries several ways to outfox the butler (scaling the wall with a grappling hook, swinging in through the window on a rope, etc.), all of which fail, until Daffy hides himself in a package designed to look like a bottle of champagne (which the butler tries to keep for himself). Caught again, Daffy runs for his life and escapes via dumbwaiter as the butler chases him with an ax and then tries to shoot him with a cannon, which Daffy narrowly avoids.

As the butler is about to dispose of him permanently, Daffy accuses him of not wanting Cubish to regain his health. The butler is astounded, but then Daffy accuses him of attempted murder with an elaborate story he invents on the spot (eventually asiding to the audience, "What's Humphrey Bogart got that I ain't got?").  Having frightened the butler into incoherence, Daffy tricks him into fleeing the mansion in disguise to avoid arrest, which he quickly does.

Finally, Daffy makes it to Cubish's bedroom, but before he can even start, slips on a rug and falls onto a tray of food, covering himself in cake which, to Daffy's confusion, causes Cubish to start laughing.  In the end, a newspaper reports that laughter has miraculously saved Cubish's life, and Cubish has kept Daffy on as his personal jester, merrily throwing pies at Daffy's face while he stands in front of a target. "It's a living," Daffy mutters to the audience, before he is hit with one last pie onscreen as the cartoon closes.

Home media
VHS - Looney Tunes: The Collectors Edition Volume 3: The Vocal Genius 
DVD - Looney Tunes Super Stars' Daffy Duck: Frustrated Fowl

See also
Looney Tunes and Merrie Melodies filmography (1940–1949)
List of Daffy Duck cartoons

Notes
Daffy would also appear as a salesman in The Stupor Salesman (1948), Fool Coverage (1952), and Design for Leaving (1954). Elmer Fudd is Daffy's foil in the latter cartoon.
This cartoon was edited into, and served as the genesis of the plot for, the 1988 compilation feature Daffy Duck's Quackbusters. In the film, Cubish "dies laughing" and leaves his entire fortune to Daffy, on the grounds that he use it to perform a beneficial public service "and to display honesty in all business affairs". When Cubish returns in spectral form and threatens to take away Daffy's inheritance, Daffy forms a ghost-hunting business to "rid the world of disgusting ectoplasmic slime like J.P. Cubish!...Uh, I mean, nice ectoplasmic slime like J.P. Cubish!".
This was one of only five post-1948 WB cartoons to get a Blue Ribbon reissue prior to 1956 - with the original credits cut. The others were The Foghorn Leghorn, Kit for Cat, Scaredy Cat, and You Were Never Duckier. Daffy Dilly is still:
the only one of the five that does not have its original titles restored for DVD release. However, a print of the original version is in possession of the Old Greenbelt Theatre in Greenbelt, Maryland.
the only one of the five to have been originally released in Cinecolor; the others were released in Technicolor). Since the short was originally released in Cinecolor and re-released in Technicolor, the original closing titles were omitted and replaced with Blue Ribbon closing titles.
Despite the existence of an original print, the restored version as seen on Looney Tunes Super Stars' Daffy Duck: Frustrated Fowl is the Blue Ribbon version (it is not known if WB was aware of the original print's existence or not). It is the only creditless Blue Ribbon in the post-1948 package to be presented as such on DVD.

References

External links

Daffy Dilly on the Internet Archive

1948 animated films
1948 short films
1948 films
Merrie Melodies short films
Short films directed by Chuck Jones
Cinecolor films
Films about businesspeople
Films scored by Carl Stalling
Daffy Duck films
Warner Bros. Cartoons animated short films
1940s Warner Bros. animated short films
Films with screenplays by Michael Maltese
Films set in country houses
Films about salespeople